Super truck may refer to:

 Hyundai Super Truck
 Stadium Super Trucks
 Super Trucks Racing, also released in Europe as Super Trucks
 Trophy truck or supertruck, a vehicle used in high-speed off-road racing
 F650 Supertruck
 GMC Hummer EV, "world's first
all-electric supertruck"